Eugene Loring (August 2, 1911 – August 30, 1982) was an American dancer, choreographer, teacher, and administrator.

Biography

Eugene Loring was born as Le Roy Kerpestein, the son of a saloon-keeper, grew up on a small island in Wisconsin's
Milwaukee River. He took gymnastic lessons. His artistic education in Milwaukee was formative. Nine years of piano training developed his musical ability broadly into orchestration, and his work with the Wisconsin Players, particularly under the direction of Russian native Boris Glagolin, developed his strong theatrical sense and gave him an awareness of dance as a theatrical force.

With savings from his job as a hardware-store manager, Loring went to New York City near the depth of the Great Depression in 1934, and was taken into George Balanchine's and Lincoln Kirstein's newly formed School of American Ballet. With the Russian Imperial training given by SAB, he danced with Balanchine's first American company, American Ballet, and even auditioned successfully for Michel Fokine.  

When Kirstein formed the specifically American choreographic training company Ballet Caravan in 1936, Loring and Lew Christensen (who together formed a little company, Dance Players, 1941–42) emerged as its outstanding products.

Within two years Loring choreographed and danced in Billy the Kid, which enjoys status as the first American ballet classic, with an unbroken history of production since.  After choreographic residence at Bennington College, Vermont, where he made some works, Loring joined Ballet Theatre (now ABT) in 1939, where, in that company's first season, he choreographed and danced in his The Great American Goof, with libretto by William Saroyan.

Loring, who began dancing in his father's saloon, was at ease with all kinds of dance: national, classic, modern, theater or not.  He choreographed the Broadway musicals Carmen Jones and Silk Stockings and had an extensive career in Hollywood, directing and choreographing for film and television.  Dancers he worked with most frequently include Fred Astaire, Cyd Charisse, and James Mitchell. Some of Loring's most notable films include: Silk Stockings, Funny Face (both in 1957), Ziegfeld Follies, The Toast of New Orleans, Deep in My Heart, Meet Me in Las Vegas.

Loring resettled in Los Angeles in 1943 on contract with MGM (Loring had a feature role in National Velvet even before he choreographed for them) and commissioned Richard Neutra to build his home in the Hollywood Hills neighbourhood in 1959. In Los Angeles, he turned his attention to regularizing and applying his principles of versatile "Freestyle" professional dance education, including (from 1955) his own dance notation, Kineseography. Loring operated the commercially successful American School of Dance in Hollywood along those principles, and from 1965 developed them in a university educational setting, on invitation by Dean Clayton Garrison to chair the Department of Dance within the School of Fine Arts of the newly formed University of California, Irvine. Loring retired from UCI in 1981, returned to New York State but died a year later, aged seventy-one.

Brief estimate
Loring's most popular choreographed work, Billy the Kid, is sometimes compared with Agnes de Mille's later Rodeo.  Like Rodeo, Billy the Kid has a score by Aaron Copland and draws on the mythology of the American West. However unlike de Mille's ballet, Billy the Kid offers a bleak vision of the frontier, with a protagonist more fittingly characterized, according to one recent critic, as a "murderous psychopath".

Eugene Loring: ballet choreology
Harlequin for President (1936)
Yankee Clipper (1937)
Billy the Kid (1938)
City Portrait (1939)
The Great American Goof (1940)
Prairie
The Man from Midian
Yolanda and The Thief (1945) Movie. MGM. (including 15-minute 'Dream Ballet' sequence.)
The Capitol of the World (1953)
"The 5,000 Fingers of Dr. T" (1953)
These Three (1966)

References

Sources
Two full, well-organized listings of collections of Loring's papers, letters, recordings, films etc. are available on line:
New York Public Library Digital Library Collections site: Index to the Eugene Loring Papers

External links

Archival collections
Guide to the Eugene Loring Papers. Special Collections and Archives, The UC Irvine Libraries, Irvine, California.

Other

Dance Heritage Coalition
NY Times obituary, September 1, 1982

American male ballet dancers
American choreographers
20th-century American Jews
Ballet choreographers
1911 births
1982 deaths
20th-century American ballet dancers